Body Language is the fourth solo album by  Jonathan Cain, the keyboard player and composer for the band Journey. The album was recorded at Cain's home studio, Wild Horse Studio, and released in 1997.

The CD is among the small number of recordings issued with High Definition Compatible Digital (HDCD) encoding.

Its catalogue number is Higher Octave Music 7104.

Track listing
All tracks written by Cain except as noted.
 "Paradiso" – 4:45
 "Body Language" – 4:35
 "Moonlight at Marbella" – 4:28
 "Crazy with the Heat" – 4:24
 "Even in My Wildest Dreams" – 5:21
 "Melt Away" – 4:24
 "I'll Always Remember" (Cain, Steve Perry) – 4:15
 "Cry for Love" – 4:46
 "Eyes of Chacmool" – 4:10
 "Daydream" – 4:20
 "With Your Love" – 3:08

Personnel
 Jonathan Cain - vocals, keyboards, producer, arranger
 Steve Smith - drums
 Chris Camozzi - guitars
 Tommy Bradford - drums
 Matt Marshall - executive producer
 Dan Selene - executive producer

References

1997 albums
Higher Octave albums